Polycarp (AD 69-155), was one of the Christian Apostolic Fathers and Bishop of Smyrna.

Polycarp, the Latin Polycarpus, or the Germanized Polykarp may also refer to:

in religion:
 Polycarpus, the conventional title of a compilation of Gregory of San Grisogono
 Polycarp of Alexandria, a 4th-century Christian martyr
 Polycarpus I of Byzantium (died AD 81), Bishop of Byzantium
 Polycarpus II of Byzantium  (died AD 144), Bishop of Byzantium
 Polycarp the Archimandrite (died 1182) of the Kiev Caves, an Eastern Orthodox saint
 Polycarpus Augin Aydin (born  1971), Syriac Orthodox Church bishops
 Polykarp Leyser the Elder (1552 – 1610), German Lutheran theologian, superintendent in Braunschweig
 Polykarp Leyser II (1586 – 1633), German Lutheran theologian, superintendent in Leipzig
 Polykarp Leyser III (1656 – 1725), German Lutheran theologian, superintendent, chaplain and orientalist
 Polykarp Leyser IV (1690 – 1728), German Lutheran theologian, philosopher, physician, lawyer and historian

in other uses:
 Johann Christian Polycarp Erxleben (1744 – 1777), German scientist
 Polycarp (children's TV show host), children's TV show host in south Louisiana
 Polykarp Kusch (1911 – 1993), German-American physicist and Nobel laureate
 Saint-Polycarpe, a commune in the Aude department in southern France
 Saint-Polycarpe, Quebec, a municipality in the Vaudreuil-Soulanges Regional County Municipality in the Montérégie region in Quebec, Canada